David Hicks (born 1975) is an Australian formerly detained at Guantanamo Bay.

David Hicks may also refer to:
David Hicks (chaplain) (born 1942), US Army Chief of Chaplains
David Hicks (rugby league) (born 1978), rugby league player
David Hicks (ski jumper) (born 1945), American ski jumper
David Hicks (basketball) (born 1988), American basketball player in Israel
David Hicks (designer) (1929–1998), British interior designer
David L. Hicks (born 1963), American Anglican bishop